Edward Malone is the name of:

Eddie Malone (baseball) (1920–2006), American professional baseball player
Edward Cyril Malone (born 1937), Saskatchewan lawyer and politician
Eddie Malone (born 1985), Scottish footballer
Edward Malone, the protagonist of the 1912 Arthur Conan Doyle novel The Lost World and its sequels

See also
Ted Malone (disambiguation)
Ed Malone (disambiguation)